Wenche Lægraid (born March 4, 1965) is a Norwegian sprint canoer who competed in the mid-1980s. At the 1984 Summer Olympics in Los Angeles, she finished sixth in the K-4 500 m event.

References
Wenche Lægraid's profile at Sports Reference.com

External links

1965 births
Canoeists at the 1984 Summer Olympics
Living people
Norwegian female canoeists
Olympic canoeists of Norway
20th-century Norwegian people